Shakedown 3 is a compilation album by Freemasons. It was released on 4 August 2014.

Composition
As with Freemasons' previous full-length release, Shakedown 2 (2009), Shakedown 3 features singles released since then by the producing team ("Believer", featuring Wynter Gordon, "Bring It Back" or "Tears", featuring Katherine Ellis), as well as some remixes for major artists, like Whitney Houston ("Million Dollar Bill"), Hurts ("Wonderful Life"), or John Newman (Cheating).

Small and Wiltshire also decided to revive the Pegasus alias, which they used for a song of the same name (released in 1998). Multiple tracks from this project are thus showcased along the other tracks from the compilation.

Release
The physical release of Shakedown 3 consists of three CDs: the first two are mixes, and the third one contains unmixed tracks, similar to their 2007 album Unmixed.

A separate digital release, Shakedown 3 (The Acapella Album), was released on 30 November. It includes accapella and "DJ tools" tracks of songs from the album.

Track listing

Notes
 "Discopolis" contains sections from "Tears" by Freemasons feat. Katherine Ellis.
 Production / Remix and additional production on all tracks by Freemasons, except "Gorecki" : produced by Freemasons and Sarah De Courcy.

Covers
 "Gorecki" is a cover of the song of the same name by the English electronic music duo Lamb.
 "La Serenissima (Theme From Venice In Peril)" is a composition from La Serenissima (also released as "Venice In Peril"), a 1981 album by Italian chamber orchestra Rondò Veneziano.
 "Intoxicated" contains lyrics lifted from Mariah Carey's 1991 single "Emotions".
 "Discopolis" is a cover of the track of the same name by Lifelike and Kris Menace.

References

Freemasons (band) albums
2014 compilation albums
Sequel albums